Stadio Alberto Braglia is a football stadium in Modena, Italy. The stadium was built in 1936 and holds 21,092 people.

History
The stadium was named after Alberto Braglia who was an Italian gymnast. Artists that have performed at the stadium include Sting, Prince, Simple Minds, U2, Pink Floyd, Guns N' Roses and Rage Against the Machine, among others.

The stadium is currently the home of Modena F.C. 2018 and previously Modena F.C. and Carpi from their promotion to the 2015–16 Serie A season after their Stadio Sandro Cabassi did not meet Serie A capacity rules. The stadium has also been a temporary home to U.S. Sassuolo Calcio from 2008 to 2013 (because their own stadium, Stadio Enzo Ricci, didn't meet Serie B stadiums criteria) until the club's choice to dispute their home matches at Stadio Città del Tricolore after their first promotion to Serie A.

The stadium held a 2010–11 UEFA Europa League clash between Juventus F.C. and Shamrock Rovers F.C. in August 2010 .

The stadium held an international rugby union with Italy playing Fiji on 27 November 2010.
In 2013 the North Stand was named after the late former Modena player Paolo Ponzo. 
In 2017 Modena F.C. was stripped of the management of the stadium by the local Municipality due to irregularities in the payments and the lack of responsibilities in managing the stadium, which was in fact left without the necessary requirements for months during the Caliendo administration. Modena started the 2017/18 season in Serie C without a home, forced to play home games in Forlì: the fans decided to boycott the games in opposition to president Caliendo, insisting that he leaves Modena and the city.

August 2015

The old natural grass has been changed with the Mixto hybrid grass technology.

References

Modena F.C.
U.S. Sassuolo Calcio
A.C. Carpi
Alberto Braglia
Buildings and structures in Modena
Sports venues in Emilia-Romagna
Sports venues completed in 1936
Alberto